Warsh was the nickname of ‘Uthmān ibn Sa‘īd al-Quṭbī (died 812), an Egyptian transmitter of the Qur’ān

Warsh recitation is a style of Qur’ānic recitation, named after the above individual

Warsh may also refer to:

 David Warsh, journalist
 Kevin Warsh (born 1970), member of the Board of Governors of the Federal Reserve System
 Lewis Warsh (born 1944), author